Craig County is a county located in the Commonwealth of Virginia. As of the 2020 census, the population was 4,892. Its county seat is New Castle.

Craig County is part of the Roanoke, VA Metropolitan Statistical Area.

History
Nestled in the mountains of Southwest Virginia, Craig County was named for Robert Craig, a 19th-century Virginia congressman. The initial outpost in the area was called "Craig's Camp," and it is claimed that George Washington visited it in 1756 during his travels to the frontier. Formed from parts of Botetourt, Roanoke, Giles, and Monroe (in present-day West Virginia) counties in 1851, Craig was later enlarged with several subsequent additions from neighboring counties. 

The secluded, mountainous New Castle community, the county seat, has one of the commonwealth's antebellum court complexes, including a porticoed courthouse built in 1851. Craig Healing Springs, a collection of well-preserved early-20th-century resort buildings representative of the architecture of Virginia's more modest mountain spas, is located here.

Geography
Most of the county is national forest.

Adjacent counties
Alleghany County – north
Botetourt County – east
Roanoke County – southeast
Montgomery County – south
Giles County – southwest
Monroe County, West Virginia – west

National protected area
Jefferson National Forest (part)

Major highways

Demographics

2020 census

Note: the US Census treats Hispanic/Latino as an ethnic category. This table excludes Latinos from the racial categories and assigns them to a separate category. Hispanics/Latinos can be of any race.

2000 Census
As of the census of 2000, there were 5,091 people, 2,060 households, and 1,507 families residing in the county.  The population density was 15 people per square mile (6/km2).  There were 2,554 housing units at an average density of 8 per square mile (3/km2).  The racial makeup of the county was 98.94% White, 0.20% Black or African American, 0.22% Native American, 0.16% Asian, 0.14% from other races, and 0.35% from two or more races.  0.33% of the population were Hispanic or Latino of any race.

There were 2,060 households, out of which 30.80% had children under the age of 18 living with them, 61.90% were married couples living together, 7.00% had a female householder with no husband present, and 26.80% were non-families. 23.90% of all households were made up of individuals, and 10.50% had someone living alone who was 65 years of age or older.  The average household size was 2.45 and the average family size was 2.88.

In the county, the population was spread out, with 23.60% under the age of 18, 6.40% from 18 to 24, 29.70% from 25 to 44, 26.70% from 45 to 64, and 13.60% who were 65 years of age or older.  The median age was 40 years. For every 100 females there were 103.40 males.  For every 100 females age 18 and over, there were 101.50 males.

The median income for a household in the county was $37,314, and the median income for a family was $41,750. Males had a median income of $26,713 versus $21,337 for females. The per capita income for the county was $17,322.  About 6.60% of families and 10.30% of the population were below the poverty line, including 15.90% of those under age 18 and 10.50% of those age 65 or over.

Government

Board of Supervisors
Craig City District: Rusty Zimmerman (Vice Chair)
Craig Creek District: Lindsey Dunne
New Castle District: Jesse Spence (Chair)
Potts Mountain District: Carl Bailey
Simmonsville District: Kathi Toelke

Constitutional officers
Clerk of the Circuit Court: Sharon P. Oliver (I)
Commissioner of the Revenue: Elizabeth Huffman (I)
Commonwealth's Attorney: Matthew Dunne (R)
Sheriff: Trevor Craddock (R)
Treasurer: Jackie Parsons (I)

Craig County is represented by Republican Stephen D. "Steve" Newman in the Virginia Senate, Republican Joe McNamara in the Virginia House of Delegates, and Republican H. Morgan Griffith in the U.S. House of Representatives.

Politics

Communities

Town
New Castle

Unincorporated communities
Abbott
Maggie
Paint Bank
Simmonsville

See also
National Register of Historic Places listings in Craig County, Virginia

References

 
1851 establishments in Virginia
Virginia counties
Counties of Appalachia